Mark Jefferson (1863–1949) was the chief cartographer of the American Delegation to the Paris Peace Conference in 1919.  He was also the head of the geography department at Michigan State Normal College (MSNC), now Eastern Michigan University (EMU), from 1901-1939.

Jefferson received his bachelor's degree from Boston University and his master's degree from Harvard University.  From 1883-1889 he worked at an astronomical observatory in Argentina.  From 1890-1901 he was a high school teacher in Massachusetts.  In addition to teaching at MSNC he also taught at the Harvard Summer School.  Among Jefferson's students were geographers 
Isaiah Bowman and Charles C. Colby.

In 1916 Jefferson served as president of the American Association of Geographers.

A biography of Jefferson entitled Mark Jefferson: Geographer written by Geoffrey J. Martin was published by Eastern Michigan University Press in 1968.  EMU has a building named after Mark Jefferson.

Sources
CSISS article based on Jefferson's work
Aurora (MSNC yearbook) 1918.
Annals of the American Association of Geographers Vol. 39, no. 4

1863 births
Boston University alumni
Harvard University alumni
Eastern Michigan University faculty
Harvard Summer School instructors
American geographers
1949 deaths
Presidents of the American Association of Geographers